The Fifth Disciple (aka Brány Skeldalu II) is a Czech adventure video game by Napoleon Games that was released on December 1, 2002 for Microsoft Windows. It is the sequel to Brány Skeldalu and was followed by Brány Skeldalu 3: 7 Mágů.

Plot and gameplay
Engeor, a student at the University of Magic, needs to save their homeland Rovenland from the evil wizard Wahargem.

The Fifth Disciple is a fantasy point and click adventure with RPG elements and inventory based puzzles.

Critical reception
Just Adventure gave the game an A, praising its combat and linking it to that of Shannara. Bonusweb felt it was a high-quality game that deserved attention from the video game industry. While Tiscali.cz questioned the mix of genres, overall they felt the game was enjoyable.

References

2002 video games
Role-playing video games
Fantasy video games
Video games developed in the Czech Republic
Windows games
Windows-only games
Dungeon crawler video games
Video game sequels

Single-player video games
Napoleon Games games